The All-Ukrainian Party of People's Trust is a political party in Ukraine registered in August 2000 as the Party of protection of disadvantaged people of Ukraine.

The party participated independently in the 2006 and 2007 Ukrainian parliamentary elections. In the 2006 parliamentary elections, the party failed to win parliamentary representation. In the 2007 parliamentary elections, the party failed to win parliamentary representation again,  winning 0.11% and 0.02%  of the vote respectively. The party did not participate in the 2012 parliamentary elections. And again not in the 2014 Ukrainian parliamentary election.

References

External links
Official website

Political parties in Ukraine